Miriam Staudte (born 4 November 1975 in Kiel) is a German politician for the Alliance '90/The Greens.

She was elected to the Landtag of Lower Saxony in 2008.

References

External links

Personal Web site

Living people
Alliance 90/The Greens politicians
Members of the Landtag of Lower Saxony
Women members of State Parliaments in Germany
1975 births
21st-century German women politicians